Gubbeen Cheese is a surface ripened, semi-soft, cow's milk cheese with a pink and white rind. The flavours are creamy with mushroom and nutty aftertastes but vary depending on maturity of cheese. Gubbeen Farmhouse Products also produce a Smoked Gubbeen.

Gubbeen Cheese has been produced since 1979 by Tom and Giana Ferguson at the  Gubbeen Farm in Schull, County Cork. The name "Gubbeen" is an anglicisation of the Irish word "Gobín" which means a small mouthful, and which a local nearby bay is referred to.

All milk used for the cheese comes from their own herd of dairy cows, which is a mixture of several breeds; British Friesian, Simmenthal, Jersey, and Kerry.  The milk is stored in vats to which starter culture and rennet are added, causing the milk to set. This is then cut and stirred until the curds develop. The cheese is developed in curing rooms where the rind is washed daily. This is an important part of the process as the washing gives rise to the distinctive surface bloom and develops the characteristic flavours. The cheese develops deeper flavours as it matures.

In 2001, a new strain of lactic acid producing bacteria, Microbacterium gubbeenense, was named after a study into the smear-ripening of Gubbeen cheese.

The cheese is also available as a mini-truckle weighing 400 g.

Awards 
Gubbeen cheese has been the recipient of numerous awards, both nationally and internationally.  Here is a selection of some recent awards:
 2011 Silver Medal in the Irish Cheese Awards for semi-soft cheese
 2010 Gold Medal at the British Cheese Awards for semi-soft cheese
 2016 Gold Medal at the British Cheese Awards for Rind washed cheese
 2016  Gold Medal at the British Cheese Awards for Mature smoked Gubbeen

See also 
 List of Irish cheeses
 List of smoked foods

References 

Irish cheeses
Cow's-milk cheeses
Smoked cheeses